Madhavaram, is an uninhabited village in Krishna district in the state of Andhra Pradesh in India.

Demographics

References 

Towns in Krishna district